This list of Brigham Young University faculty includes notable current and former instructors and administrators of Brigham Young University (BYU), a private, coeducational research university owned by the Church of Jesus Christ of Latter-day Saints and located in Provo, Utah, United States. It includes faculty at its related academic colleges and two schools, including the Marriott School of Management and the J. Reuben Clark Law School. As of the fall of 2007, BYU employed 1,300 instructional faculty, 88% of whom were tenured or on tenure track, and approximately 2,900 administrative and staff personnel. Part-time employees included approximately 900 faculty, administrative and staff personnel and 12,000 students.

College of Family, Home and Social Sciences

College of Fine Arts and Communications

College of Humanities

College of Life Sciences

College of Physical and Mathematical Sciences

College of Religious Education

J. Reuben Clark School of Law

Marriott School of Management

McKay School of Education

See also 

 List of presidents of Brigham Young University
 List of Brigham Young University alumni

References

External links 
 BYU Faculty Directory

 
Brigham Young University faculty
Lists of people from Utah